Scottish Fencing is the national governing body for the Olympic sport of fencing in Scotland.

References

External links
 

Sport in Scotland
Sports governing bodies in Scotland
Fencing in Scotland